Jack Combs was a professional baseball pitcher in the Negro leagues. He played with the Detroit Stars from 1923 to 1926. He is also listed as A. Clark Combs.

References

External links
 and Seamheads

Detroit Stars players
Year of birth missing
Year of death missing
Baseball pitchers